Carolyne is a Swedish feminine given name that is an alternate form of Caroline as well as a diminutive form of Carola.  Notable people referred to by this name include the following:

Given name

Carolyne Barry, (1943 – 2015), American dancer and dance instructor
Carolyne Bernard (born 1994), Tanzanian beauty queen
Carolyne Christie (born 1946), English aristocrat
Carolyne Larrington (born 1959), British literature scholar and author.
Carolyne Lepage (born 1975), Canadian judoka
Carolyne Mas (born 1955), American singer-songwriter and record producer
Carolyne Mazzo (born 1997), Brazilian swimmer
Carolyne Morrison (1905–1997), Canadian politician
Carolyne Oughton (born 1952), Canadian former alpine skier
Carolyne Pedro (born 2000), Brazilian artistic gymnast 
Carolyne Roehm (born 1951), American author, businesswoman, socialite, and former fashion designer
Carolyne Underwood (born 1982), British television personality
Carolyne M. Van Vliet, Dutch-born American physicist
Carolyne Wright, American poet
Carolyne zu Sayn-Wittgenstein (1819–1887), Polish noblewoman

See also

Carlyne
Caroline (name)
Carolyn
Carolynn
Carolynne
Károlyné Honfi

Notes

Swedish feminine given names